Grand Ole Opry Favorites is a 1964 album by American Country music group, the Browns.  In 2000, this album and another album, Sweet Sounds by the Browns, were re-released together on the same compact disc.

Track listing

Side one
 "Don't Let the Stars Get in Your Eyes" (Slim Willet) – 2:20
 "Sugarfoot Rag" (Hank Garland, Vaughn Horton) – 1:58
 "Great Speckled Bird" (Guy Smith) – 2:36
 "You Nearly Lose Your Mind" (Ernest Tubb) – 2:19
 "Mansion on the Hill" (Hank Williams, Fred Rose) – 2:21
 "Tragic Romance" (Louis M. Jones, Wiley Morris, Zeke Morris) – 2:48

Side two
 "Fair and Tender Ladies" (Traditional) – 2:34
 "The Rhumba Boogie" (Hank Snow) – 2:01
 "Mommy, Please Stay Home With Me" (Eddy Arnold, Wally Fowler, Graydon J. Hall) – 3:04
 "Looking Back to See" (Jim Ed Brown, Maxine Brown) – 2:18
 "Four Walls" (Marvin Moore, George Campbell) – 3:06
 "Wondering" (Joe Werner) – 2:25

Personnel
Jim Ed Brown – vocals
Maxine Brown – vocals
Bonnie Brown – vocals
Jerry Reed – guitar
Velma Smith – guitar
Harold Morrison – dobro, banjo
Henry Strzelecki – bass
Kenneth Buttrey – drums
Bill Pursell – piano
Vocals by Anita Kerr, Priscilla Hubbard, Louis Nunley, Bill Wright, Glenn Baxter

References

External links
CMT Entry for "Grand Ole Opry Favorites"
CMT Entry for 2000 "Sweet Sounds by the Browns"/"Grand Ole Opry Favorites" CD

The Browns albums
1964 albums
Albums produced by Chet Atkins
RCA Victor albums